Milano Independent School District is a public school district based in Milano, Texas, U.S., at 500 N. 5th Street.In 2017, the Eagles had their best football season ever going 11–2.They captured the Bi-District Championship and the Area Championship.

In 2009, the school district was rated "academically acceptable" by the Texas Education Agency.

Schools
Milano High (Grades 9-12)
Milano Junior High (Grades 6-8)
Milano Elementary (Grades PK-5)

References

External links
Milano ISD

School districts in Milam County, Texas